Grant Gardiner (born 26 February 1965) is an Australian former cricketer. He played 20 first-class cricket matches for Victoria between 1994 and 1998.  He was the first batsman reach one thousand runs in a season in Victorian District Cricket since its inception in 1906/07.

See also
 List of Victoria first-class cricketers

References

External links
 

1965 births
Living people
Australian cricketers
Victoria cricketers
Cricketers from Melbourne